Joseph Tyers (born 15 September 2000) is an English international boxer. He has represented England at the Commonwealth Games.

Biography
Tyers sparred with fighters Pat McCormack and Luke McCormack at the 2020 Summer Olympics in Tokyo. He trains at GB Boxing's high-performance base in Sheffield. Tyers was the runner-up to Masood Abdulah in the 2019 England Boxing National Amateur Championships when boxing for Darlington BC.

In 2022, he was selected for the 2022 Commonwealth Games in Birmingham where he competed in men's light welterweight division.

References

External links 
 

2000 births
Living people
English male boxers
British male boxers
Light-welterweight boxers
Commonwealth Games competitors for England
Boxers at the 2022 Commonwealth Games
21st-century English people